The term Chess Bundesliga normally refers to the premier league of team chess in Germany established in 1980. It is arguably the strongest league of its kind and attracts many high-rated grandmasters.

Austria also has a Bundesliga for chess, usually described as the Bundesliga OST (for Österreich).

Format
Sixteen teams face each other in a single round robin format, each match-day team formed of eight players. The season runs between October and April. Team members may be male or female, but there is also a separate Bundesliga restricted to female players ("Frauen-Schach-Bundesliga"). Each playing weekend normally comprises two matches for each team, played on consecutive days.

Matches are arranged to that teams pair up as "travelling partners". Many of the titled professionals are paid an appearance fee and/or travel expenses.

Season 2006/07
Prior to the commencement of the season, reigning champions  started as runaway favourites - their impressive squad was topped by Viswanathan Anand, Peter Svidler, Alexei Shirov, Étienne Bacrot, Magnus Carlsen, Liviu-Dieter Nisipeanu, Pentala Harikrishna and Francisco Vallejo Pons. GMs Peter Heine Nielsen, Sergei Movsesian and Michał Krasenkow were just three of the other players.

OSC Baden-Baden successfully defended their title, whereas Werder Bremen faded badly after a good start and so a close fight developed for the remaining places. Unexpectedly,  confounded the ratings to take second place, its Polish contingent Radosław Wojtaszek and Robert Kempiński scoring heavily.  

SG Porz and TSV Bindlach-Aktionar finished in third and fourth places respectively, with outstanding performances coming from Loek van Wely (also undefeated) for Porz and Vladimir Baklan and David Baramidze for Bindlach.

Recent seasons
Teams finishing in the top four places in recent seasons were as follows:
 2003/4 - 1. SG Porz | 2. SC Baden-Oos | 3. TV Tegernsee | 4. SV Werder Bremen
 2004/5 - 1. SV Werder Bremen | 2. SG Porz | 3. OSC Baden-Baden | 4. TV Tegernsee
 2005/6 - 1. OSC Baden-Baden | 2. Werder Bremen | 3. SG Porz | 4. SG Solingen
 2006/7 - 1. OSC Baden-Baden | 2. Hamburger SK | 3. SG Porz | 4. Bindlach Aktionär
 2007/8 - 1. OSC Baden-Baden | 2. Werder Bremen | 3. Mülheim | 4. Bindlach Aktionär
 2008/9 - 1. OSG Baden-Baden | 2. SC Eppingen | 3. Werder Bremen | 4. Mülheim
 2009/10 - 1. OSG Baden-Baden | 2. Werder Bremen | 3. SG Solingen | 4. Mülheim
 2010/11 - 1. OSG Baden-Baden | 2. Werder Bremen | 3. SC Eppingen | 4. SG Solingen
 2011/12 - 1. OSG Baden-Baden | 2. Werder Bremen | 3. SG Solingen | 4. SC Eppingen
 2012/13 - 1. OSG Baden-Baden | 2. Mülheim | 3. SG Solingen | 4. SC Eppingen
 2013/14 - 1. OSG Baden-Baden | 2. Mülheim | 3. SV Hockenheim | 4. SC Eppingen
 2014/15 - 1. OSG Baden-Baden | 2. Werder Bremen | 3. SV Hockenheim | 4. SK Schwäbisch Hall
 2015/16 - 1. SG Solingen | 2. OSG Baden-Baden | 3. Werder Bremen | 4. SK Schwäbisch Hall
 2016/17 - 1. OSG Baden-Baden | 2. SV 1930 Hockenheim | 3. SG Solingen | 4. SK Schwaebisch Hall
 2017/18 - 1. OSG Baden Baden | 2. SG Solingen | 3. SV Hockenheim | 4. SV Werder Bremen
 2018/19 - 1. OSG Baden Baden | 2. SV Hockenheim | 3. SG Solingen | 4. SF Deizisau
 2019/20

See also
4NCL, the British-based Four Nations Chess League

References

External links
  
 Chess Bundesliga since 1998 (reports, pictures, games) by TeleSchach 

Chess Bundesliga
Bundesliga
Sports leagues in Germany
Professional sports leagues in Germany